The northern bentbill (Oncostoma cinereigulare) is a species of bird in the family Tyrannidae. It is found in Belize, Colombia, Costa Rica, El Salvador, Guatemala, Honduras, Mexico, Nicaragua, and Panama. Its natural habitats are subtropical or tropical dry forest, subtropical or tropical moist lowland forest, and heavily degraded former forest.

References

Further reading

northern bentbill
Birds of Central America
northern bentbill
northern bentbill
Taxonomy articles created by Polbot